Eastern District was one of four districts of the Province of Quebec created in 1788 in the western reaches of the Montreal District and partitioned in 1791 to create the new colony of Upper Canada.

Historical evolution
The District, originally known as Lunenburg District (after Lüneburg in Germany), was constituted in 1788 in the Province of Quebec, and was described as:

The District was renamed as "Eastern District" in 1792, and its jail and courthouse were established in New Johnstown.

In 1798, the new Parliament of Upper Canada divided the District in two, which went into force in January 1800, and the new Districts consisted of the following electoral counties:

In 1816, Prescott and Russell were removed from the District, to form the new Ottawa District.

At the beginning of 1850, the district was abolished and replaced by the United Counties of Stormont, Dundas and Glengarry for municipal and judicial purposes.

See also
 Cornwall Collegiate and Vocational School - founded 1806 as Cornwall Grammar School and Eastern District Grammar School 1807

Further reading
Armstrong, Frederick H. Handbook of Upper Canadian Chronology, Toronto : Dundurn Press, 1985. 
 "Changing Shape of Ontario: Early Districts and Counties", Archives of Canada 
Pringle, J.F. Lunenburgh or the Old Eastern District, Belleville: Mika Publishing Company, 1980
MacDonell, J.A.  Sketches Illustrating the Early Settlement and History of Glengarry in Canada, Milton: Global Heritage Press.

References

 

Districts of Upper Canada
1788 establishments in the Province of Quebec (1763–1791)
1849 disestablishments in Canada